Bouldering is a form of free climbing that is performed on small rock formations or artificial rock walls without the use of ropes or harnesses. While bouldering can be done without any equipment, most climbers use climbing shoes to help secure footholds, chalk to keep their hands dry and to provide a firmer grip, and bouldering mats to prevent injuries from falls. Traverses, which are a form of boulder problem, require the climber to climb horizontally from one end to another. Artificial climbing walls allow boulderers to climb indoors in areas without natural boulders. In addition, bouldering competitions take place in both indoor and outdoor settings.

The sport was originally a method of training for roped climbs and mountaineering, so climbers could practice specific moves at a safe distance from the ground. Additionally, the sport served to build stamina and increase finger strength. Throughout the 20th century, bouldering evolved into a separate discipline. Individual problems are assigned ratings based on difficulty. Although there have been various rating systems used throughout the history of bouldering, modern problems usually use either the V-scale or the Fontainebleau scale.

The growing popularity of bouldering has caused several environmental concerns, including soil erosion and trampled vegetation, as climbers often hike off-trail to reach bouldering sites. This has caused some landowners to restrict access or prohibit bouldering altogether.

Outdoor bouldering 

The characteristics of boulder problems depend largely on the type of rock being climbed. For example, granite often features long cracks and slabs while sandstone rocks are known for their steep overhangs and frequent horizontal breaks. Limestone and volcanic rock are also used for bouldering.

There are many prominent bouldering areas throughout the United States, including Hueco Tanks in Texas, Mount Evans in Colorado, The Appalachian Mountains in The Eastern United States, and The Buttermilks in Bishop, California. Squamish, British Columbia is one of the most popular bouldering areas in Canada. Europe is also home to a number of bouldering sites, such as Fontainebleau in France, Meschia in Italy, Albarracín in Spain, and various mountains throughout Switzerland. Africa's most prominent bouldering areas include the more established Rocklands, South Africa, the newer Oukaïmeden in Morocco or more recently opened areas like Chimanimani in Zimbabwe.

Indoor bouldering 

Artificial climbing walls are used to simulate boulder problems in an indoor environment, usually at climbing gyms. These walls are constructed with wooden panels, polymer cement panels, concrete shells, or precast molds of actual rock walls. Holds, usually made of plastic, are then bolted onto the wall to create problems. Some problems use steep overhanging surfaces which force the climber to support much of their weight using their upper body strength. Other problems are set on flat walls; Instead of requiring upper body strength, these problems create difficulty by requiring the climber to execute a series of predetermined movements to complete the route. The IFSC Climbing World Championships have noticeably included more of such problems in their competitions as of late.

Climbing gyms often feature multiple problems within the same section of wall. In the US the most common method route-setters use to designate the intended problem is by placing colored tape next to each hold. For example, red tape would indicate one bouldering problem while green tape would be used to set a different problem in the same area. Across much of the rest of the world problems and grades are usually designated using a set color of plastic hold to indicate problems and their difficulty levels. Using colored holds to set has certain advantages, the most notable of which are that it makes it more obvious where the holds for a problem are, and that there is no chance of tape being accidentally kicked off footholds. Smaller, resource-poor climbing gyms may prefer taped problems because large, expensive holds can be used in multiple routes by marking them with more than one color of tape. The tape indicates the hold(s) that the athlete should grab first.

Indoor bouldering requires very little in terms of equipment, at minimum climbing shoes, at maximum, a chalk bag, chalk, a brush, and climbing shoes.

Grading 

Bouldering problems are assigned numerical difficulty ratings by route-setters and climbers. The two most widely used rating systems are the V-scale and the Fontainebleau system.

The V-scale, which originated in the United States, is an open-ended rating system with higher numbers indicating a higher degree of difficulty. The V1 rating indicates that a problem can be completed by a novice climber in good physical condition after several attempts. The scale begins at V0, and as of 2013, the highest V rating that has been assigned to a bouldering problem is V17. Some climbing gyms also use a VB grade to indicate beginner problems.

The Fontainebleau scale follows a similar system, with each numerical grade divided into three ratings with the letters a, b, and c. For example, Fontainebleau 7A roughly corresponds with V6, while Fontainebleau 7C+ is equivalent to V10. In both systems, grades are further differentiated by appending "+" to indicate a small increase in difficulty. Despite this level of specificity, ratings of individual problems are often controversial, as ability level is not the only factor that affects how difficult a problem may be for a particular climber. Height, arm length, flexibility, and other body characteristics can also be relevant to perceived difficulty.

Highball bouldering 
Highball bouldering is simply climbing high, difficult, long, and tall boulders. Using the same protection as standard bouldering, climbers venture up house-sized rocks that test not only their physical skill and strength but mental focus. Highballing, like most of climbing, is open to interpretation. Most climbers say anything above  is a highball and can range in height up to  where highball bouldering then turns into free soloing.

Highball bouldering may have begun in 1961 when John Gill, without top-rope rehearsal, bouldered a steep face on a  granite spire called "The Thimble". The difficulty level of this ascent (V4/5 or 5.12a) was extraordinary for that time. Gill's achievement initiated a wave of climbers making ascents of large boulders. Later, with the introduction and evolution of crash pads, climbers were able to push the limits of highball bouldering ever higher.

In 2002 Jason Kehl completed the first highball at double-digit V-difficulty, called Evilution, a  boulder in the Buttermilks of California, earning the grade of V12. This climb marked the beginning of a new generation of highball climbing that pushed not only height but great difficulty. It is not unusual for climbers to rehearse such risky problems on top-rope, although this practice is not a settled issue.

Important milestone ascents in this style include:

 Ambrosia, V11, a  boulder in Bishop, California, climbed by Kevin Jorgeson in 2015.

Too Big to Flail, V10, another  line in Bishop, California, climbed by Alex Honnold in 2016.

Livin' Large, V15, a  boulder in Rocklands, South Africa, found and established by Nalle Hukkataival in 2009, which has been repeated by only one person, Jimmy Webb.

The Process, V16, a  boulder in Bishop, California, first climbed by Daniel Woods in 2015.

Competitions 

Traditionally, competition in bouldering was informal, with climbers working out problems near the limits of their abilities, then challenging their peers to repeat these accomplishments. However, modern climbing gyms allow for a more formal competitive structure.

The International Federation of Sport Climbing (IFSC) employs an indoor format (although competitions can also take place in an outdoor setting) that breaks the competition into three rounds: qualifications, semi-finals, and finals. The rounds feature different sets of four to six boulder problems, and each competitor has a fixed amount of time to attempt each problem. At the end of each round, competitors are ranked by the number of completed problems with ties settled by the total number of attempts taken to solve the problems.

Some competitions only permit climbers a fixed number of attempts at each problem with a timed rest period in between. In an open-format competition, all climbers compete simultaneously, and are given a fixed amount of time to complete as many problems as possible. More points are awarded for more difficult problems, while points are deducted for multiple attempts on the same problem.

In 2012, the IFSC submitted a proposal to the International Olympic Committee (IOC) to include lead climbing in the 2020 Summer Olympics. The proposal was later revised to an "overall" competition, which would feature bouldering, lead climbing, and speed climbing. In May 2013, the IOC announced that climbing would not be added to the 2020 Olympic program.

In 2016, the International Olympic Committee (IOC) officially approved climbing as an Olympic sport "in order to appeal to younger audiences." The Olympics will feature the earlier proposed overall competition. Medalists will be competing in all three categories for a best overall score. The score will be calculated by the multiplication of the positions that the climbers have attained in each discipline of climbing.

History 

Rock climbing first appeared as a sport in the late 1800s. Early records describe climbers engaging in what is now referred to as bouldering, not as a separate discipline, but as a playful form of training for larger ascents. It was during this time that the words "bouldering" and "problem" first appeared in British climbing literature. Oscar Eckenstein was an early proponent of the activity in the British Isles. In the early 20th century, the Fontainebleau area of France established itself as a prominent climbing area, where some of the first dedicated bleausards (or "boulderers") emerged. One of those athletes, Pierre Allain, invented the specialized shoe used for rock climbing.

Modern bouldering 

In the late 1950s through the 1960s, American mathematician John Gill pushed the sport further and contributed several important innovations, distinguishing bouldering as a separate discipline in the process. Gill previously pursued gymnastics, a sport which had an established scale of difficulty for movements and body positions, and shifted the focus of bouldering from reaching the summit to navigating a set of holds. Gill developed a rating system that was closed-ended: B1 problems were as difficult as the most challenging roped routes of the time, B2 problems were more difficult, and B3 problems had been completed once.

Gill introduced chalk as a method of keeping the climber's hands dry, promoted a dynamic climbing style, and emphasized the importance of strength training to complement skill. As Gill improved in ability and influence, his ideas became the norm.

In the 1980s, two important training tools emerged. One important training tool was bouldering mats, also referred to as "crash pads", which protected against injuries from falling and enabled boulderers to climb in areas that would have been too dangerous otherwise. The second important tool was indoor climbing walls, which helped spread the sport to areas without outdoor climbing and allowed serious climbers to train year-round.

As the sport grew in popularity, new bouldering areas were developed throughout Europe and the United States, and more athletes began participating in bouldering competitions. The visibility of the sport greatly increased in the early 2000s, as YouTube videos and climbing blogs helped boulderers around the world to quickly learn techniques, find hard problems, and announce newly completed projects.

Notable ascents 

Notable boulder climbs are chronicled by the climbing media to track progress in boulder climbing standards and levels of technical difficulty; in contrast, the hardest traditional climbing routes tend to be of lower technical difficulty due to the additional burden of having to place protection during the course of the climb, and due to the lack of any possibility of using natural protection on the most extreme climbs.

As of December 2021, female climbers Josune Bereziartu, Ashima Shiraishi, and Kaddi Lehmann have repeated boulder problems at the  boulder grade.

Equipment 

Unlike other climbing sports, bouldering can be performed safely and effectively with very little equipment, an aspect which makes the discipline highly appealing, but opinions differ. While bouldering pioneer John Sherman asserted that "The only gear really needed to go bouldering is boulders," others suggest the use of climbing shoes and a chalkbag – a small pouch where ground-up chalk is kept – as the bare minimum, and more experienced boulderers typically bring multiple pairs of climbing shoes, chalk, brushes, crash pads, and a skincare kit.

Climbing shoes have the most direct impact on performance. Besides protecting the climber's feet from rough surfaces, climbing shoes are designed to help the climber secure footholds. Climbing shoes typically fit much tighter than other athletic footwear and often curl the toes downwards to enable precise footwork. They are manufactured in a variety of different styles to perform in different situations. For example, High-top shoes provide better protection for the ankle, while low-top shoes provide greater flexibility and freedom of movement. Stiffer shoes excel at securing small edges, whereas softer shoes provide greater sensitivity. The front of the shoe, called the "toe box", can be asymmetric, which performs well on overhanging rocks, or symmetric, which is better suited for vertical problems and slabs.  

To absorb sweat, most boulderers use gymnastics chalk on their hands, stored in a chalkbag, which can be tied around the waist (also called sport climbing chalkbags), allowing the climber to reapply chalk during the climb. There are also versions of floor chalkbags (also called bouldering chalkbags), which are usually bigger than sport climbing chalkbags and are meant to be kept on the floor while climbing; this is because boulders do not usually have so many movements as to require chalking up more than once. Different sizes of brushes are used to remove excess chalk and debris from boulders in between climbs; they are often attached to the end of a long straight object in order to reach higher holds. Crash pads, also referred to as bouldering mats, are foam cushions placed on the ground to protect climbers from injury after falling.

This makes the sport significantly safer than free solo climbing, which is also performed without ropes, but with no upper limit on the height of the climb. However, minor injuries are common in bouldering, particularly sprained ankles and wrists. Two factors contribute to the frequency of injuries in bouldering: first, boulder problems typically feature more difficult moves than other climbing disciplines, making falls more common. Second, without ropes to arrest the climber's descent, every fall will cause the climber to hit the ground.

To prevent injuries, boulderers position crash pads near the boulder to provide a softer landing, as well as one or more spotters (people watching out for the climber to fall in convenient position) to help redirect the climber towards the pads. Upon landing, boulderers employ falling techniques similar to those used in gymnastics: spreading the impact across the entire body to avoid bone fractures, and positioning limbs to allow joints to move freely throughout the impact.

Technique 
Although every type of rock climbing requires a high level of strength and technique, bouldering is the most dynamic form of the sport, requiring the highest level of power and placing considerable strain on the body. Training routines that strengthen fingers and forearms are useful in preventing injuries such as tendonitis and ruptured ligaments.

However, as with other forms of climbing, bouldering technique begins with proper footwork. Leg muscles are significantly stronger than arm muscles; thus, proficient boulderers use their arms to maintain balance and body positioning as much as possible, relying on their legs to push them up the rock. Boulderers also keep their arms straight with their shoulders engaged whenever feasible, allowing their bones to support their body weight rather than their muscles.

Bouldering movements are described as either "static" or "dynamic". Static movements are those that are performed slowly, with the climber's position controlled by maintaining contact on the boulder with the other three limbs. Dynamic movements use the climber's momentum to reach holds that would be difficult or impossible to secure statically, with an increased risk of falling if the movement is not performed accurately.

Environmental impact 
Bouldering can damage vegetation that grows on rocks, such as moss and lichens. This can occur as a result of the climber intentionally cleaning the boulder, or unintentionally from repeated use of handholds and footholds. Vegetation on the ground surrounding the boulder can also be damaged from overuse, particularly by climbers laying down crash pads. Soil erosion can occur when boulderers trample vegetation while hiking off of established trails, or when they unearth small rocks near the boulder in an effort to make the landing zone safer in case of a fall. The repeated use of white climbing chalk can damage the rock surface of boulders and cliffs, particularly sandstone and other porous rock types, and the scrubbing of rocks to remove chalk can also degrade the rock surface. In order to prevent chalk from damaging the surface of the rock, it is important to remove it gently with a brush after a rock climbing session. Other environmental concerns include littering, improperly disposed feces, and graffiti. These issues have caused some land managers to prohibit bouldering, as was the case in Tea Garden, a popular bouldering area in Rocklands, South Africa.

References 

Types of climbing
Articles containing video clips